Cheney v Conn (Inspector of Taxes)  [1968] 1 WLR 242, [1968] 1 All ER 779, also known as Cheney v Inland Revenue Commissioners was a decision of the English High Court in which the Court ruled that statutes made by Parliament could not be void on grounds of illegality, restating the principle that Parliament is supreme.

Facts

Howard William Cheney, a taxpayer, had appealed to the Special Commissioners against an assessments to income tax for 1964-65, made against him under the Finance Act 1964 (and an equivalent assessment to surtax for 1963-64). A substantial part of the income tax collected was used by the UK government to fund the construction of nuclear weapons, which were banned by the Geneva Convention. Cheney argued that the use of income tax and surtax for an illegal purpose had the effect of invalidating the tax assessments made against him.

The Special Commissioners ruled that the purpose towards which the taxes collected were to be put was not relevant to the validity of the tax assessments, and that the assessments were therefore valid. Cheney appealed, but the decision was upheld by the High Court.

Judgment

Ungoed-Thomas J dismissed the appeal, holding:

Footnotes

Nuclear weapons of the United Kingdom
High Court of Justice cases
1968 in case law
1968 in British law